The Silk Road Stakes (Japanese シルクロードステークス) is a Grade 3 horse race for Thoroughbreds aged four and over, run in January over a distance of 1200 metres on turf at Kyoto Racecourse.

The Silk Road Stakes was first run in 1996 and has held Grade 3 status ever since.

Winners since 2000

Earlier winners

 1996 - Flower Park
 1997 - Eishin Berlin
 1998 - Seeking The Pearl
 1999 - Meiner Love

See also
 Horse racing in Japan
 List of Japanese flat horse races

References

Turf races in Japan